Leptusa is a genus of rove beetles in the family Staphylinidae. There are at least 20 described species in Leptusa.

Species

References

Further reading

 
 
 
 
 
 
 
 
 
 

Aleocharinae